David Hollingsworth McClain (born June 4, 1933) is an American attorney and former politician in the state of Florida.

Early life, education & military service
McClain was born in Macon, Georgia and moved to Florida in 1956. He is an alumnus Duke University (BA), George Washington University (MA), and Stetson College of Law (LLB). He served in the United States Army from 1953 to 1955 as a member of the 1st Infantry Division.

Political career
From 1964 to 1970 he served on the Board of Public Relations and Convention Facilities and served as vice chairman from 1969 to 1970. He is a former member of the Florida Law Revision Council. From 1969 to 1970 he served as a legal advisor to the Hillsborough County Republican Executive Committee. He is a former member of the Hillsborough County Republican State Committee and former assistant treasurer of the Florida Republican Party.

He was elected to the Florida State Senate for the 24th district in 1971. He was redistricted to the 21st district in 1973, and served until 1982. He is a member of the Republican Party. From 1986 to 1987 he served as an assistant city attorney in Tampa.

He was a member of the Motor Vehicle Insurance Task Force in 1989. From 1989 to 1990 he served on the Tampa Hillsborough County Expressway Authority.

Legal career
He practiced law in Florida. He was a senior partner with McClain, Smoak & Chistolini, LLC in Tampa until his retirement.

Personal life
He and his wife Carroll have two children.

References

Living people
1933 births
United States Army soldiers
People from Macon, Georgia
Republican Party Florida state senators
Stetson University College of Law alumni
Duke University alumni
21st-century American lawyers
20th-century American lawyers
George Washington University alumni